Bela Lugosi (1882–1956), best known for the original screen portrayal of Bram Stoker's Dracula in 1931, was in many movies during the course of his 39-year film career. He appeared in films made in his native Hungary, Germany and New York before re-locating to Hollywood in 1928. Films are listed in order of release. (see Bela Lugosi for his biography.)

1910s
This is a list of confirmed film roles Lugosi has performed in. Some films from other filmography sources have not been included here such as Star Film's Casanova (1918), Lulu (1918) and Lili (1917), all of which had announced that Lugosi would appear in them, but Lugosi was apparently dropped from the cast before production began.

1920s

1930s

1940s

1950s

Television/ Radio

Intimate Interviews (1932) interviewed on radio by Dorothy West 
Hollywood on Parade No. A-8 (1933) a 10-minute comedy skit/ short subject with Bonnie Poe as Betty Boop
Universal's Black Cat Contest (March 1934) this newsreel showed Karloff and Lugosi trying to pick the winner of Universal's "Black Cat Contest"
Screen Snapshots Episode 34 (1934) this newsreel shows Lugosi playing chess with Boris Karloff
Hollywood Movie Parade (1934) a short featurette co-starring Jackie Cooper
Baker's Broadcast (1937) Lugosi and Karloff sang "We're Horrible, Horrible Men" on this radio show with Ozzie and Harriet
Texaco Star Theater (Nov. 15, 1939) Lugosi appeared with Burgess Meredith on this "Dracula on Sunnybrook Farm" radio episode
Black Friday Newsreel (Jan. 18, 1940) - Lugosi shown being hypnotized by his friend Manly Hall for his death scene in Black Friday (1940); film is lost
Kay Kayser Radio Show (Sept. 25, 1940) with Karloff and Peter Lorre
The Milton Berle Show TV show (mid-1940s) Texaco Star Theatre
Play Broadcast Quiz Program (May 2, 1941) Chicago radio show
Screen Snapshots (1943) Lugosi is shown in this newsreel donating blood during World War II
Suspense Radio Show (Feb. 2, 1943) episode called "The Doctor Prescribed Death"
Texaco Star Theater: The Fred Allen Show (Apr. 25, 1943) Lugosi did a radio comedy sketch with Fred Allen
Mail Call (March 11, 1944) Lugosi appeared with Orson Welles and Edward Everett Horton on this radio show
Mystery House Radio (1944) Lugosi was to host a syndicated radio series; a pilot was apparently made with Lugosi and John Carradine called "The Thirsty Death", but it is unknown if it ever aired; the program is considered lost.
Which Is Which? Radio Show (Feb. 14, 1945) with host Ken Murray
 Country Fair Radio Show (July 31, 1945) with host Jack Bailey
Command Performance produced by the Armed Forces Radio Service (July 16, 1946) Lugosi did a "Superman" skit with Bob Hope, Paulette Goddard and Sterling Holloway (Lugosi played the villain named Dr. Bekini)
The Rudy Vallee Show Radio Show (Oct. 22, 1946) Lugosi did a short comedy skit in which he played a vampire called "The Bat"
Exploring the Unknown Radio Show (Mar. 9, 1947)
The Adventures of Ellery Queen Radio Show (Mar. 19, 1947) crime drama
Quick As a Flash Radio Show (May 18, 1947)
The Bill and Fan Show Albany N.Y. Radio show (Aug. 4, 1947) Lugosi interviewed while at Saratoga Racetrack
Backstage at the Spa Theater Schenectady TV station (August 6, 1947) Lugosi interview
Hollywood Soundstage Albany Radio show (Aug. 7, 1947) Lugosi interviewed by Cathy Rice
Candid Microphone Radio Show (Oct. 24, 1947) starring Alan Funt
The Guy Lebow Show Radio (Summer, 1948) Lugosi interview 
The Abbott and Costello Show Radio Program (May 5, 1948) Lugosi did a haunted house skit with Lou Costello and Sidney Fields
The Martha Deane Radio Show N.Y. City radio show (Aug.9, 1948) Lugosi interview
Variety Show Los Angeles TV show (Aug. 18, 1948) Lugosi appeared in a pre-filmed TV special
Night of Stars Event Madison Square Garden, NY (Nov. 15, 1948) appeared live with Boris Karloff and Peter Lorre in support of Israel
Herb Shrimer Time WCBS Radio, NYC (Nov. 22, 1948)
Surprise Theater Los Angeles TV show (Aug. 31, 1949) broadcast an episode starring Lugosi
Tales of Fatima N.Y. Radio show (Sept. 10, 1949) appeared with Basil Rathbone in "Man in the Shadows" (radio play)
Art Linkletter's House Party N.Y. Radio show (Oct. 6, 1949) Lugosi interview
Suspense N.Y. TV show (episode "The Cask of Amontillado" October 11, 1949) as General Fortunato
Texaco Star Theatre TV show (Oct. 27, 1949) Lugosi wears his cape and attempts to hypnotize Milton Berle in a skit; co-starred Olsen and Johnson; this 60-minute program exists today on DVD
Crime Does Not Pay N.Y. Radio show (Dec. 12, 1949) Lugosi plays a demented arsonist named Nick Segadin in "Gasoline Cocktail" episode (prerecorded)
Celebrity Time N.Y. TV show with Arlene Francis (January 22, 1950) this show was rerun on Dec. 22, 1950
Bonnie Maid Versatile Varieties N.Y. TV show (January 27, 1950)
Starlit Time (May 21, 1950) Lugosi appeared on this musical-variety TV show
Little Old New York WPIX-TV show (June 1, 1950) starring Ed Sullivan
The Bill Slater Show WOR-TV show (June 7, 1950)
Candid Microphone CBS Radio Show (June 27, 1950) starring Allen Funt
Murder and Bela Lugosi WPIX-TV show (Sept. 18, 1950) Lugosi did this one-hour program in which he provided the commentary about a number of his old horror films while clips were shown; historian Gary Rhodes thinks some of this "Lugosi host" footage found its way into the 1959 British Lugosi film Lock Up Your Daughters (a lost film today)(click section "1940-1959" on source page)
The Paul Winchell Show N.Y. TV (Oct. 2, 1950) as Count Dracula
The Robert Q. Lewis Show (shown Dec. 24, 1950) CBS-TV, Bela meets Santa Claus skit
Okay, Mother ABC Radio Show (December 28, 1950) Lillian Lugosi was interviewed by Dennis James
The Betty Crocker Magazine Show of the Air Radio Show (Jan. 29, 1951)
The Johnny Olson Luncheon Club Radio Show (Feb. 7, 1951)
Bela Lugosi's Horror and Magic Stage Show (Dec. 16, 1950 - March 17, 1951) (traveled throughout NY and NJ)
Crime Does Not Pay Radio Show (Feb. 18, 1951) Episode called Gasoline Cocktail (a rerun)
The Charlie Chester Show recorded in England (April 14, 1951) BBC-TV
Ship’s Reporter (December 11, 1951) Lugosi shipboard interview by Jack Mangan upon his return from England; this newsreel was aired around Christmastime
The House of Wax Premiere (April 16, 1953) appeared live in front of the Paramount Theater when the film premiered in L.A.; some footage of the event appeared in a Pathe newsreel released theatrically on April 27, 1953.
You Asked For It California TV show (July 27, 1953) performed his "Vampire Illusion"; rebroadcast on East Coast Aug. 9, 1953
The Spade Cooley Show (KTLA Radio, Halloween, 1953) Lugosi guest-starred with comedian Ukie Sherin (Lugosi's dialogue director on the film Bela Lugosi Meets a Brooklyn Gorilla).
The Red Skelton Show (June, 1954) co-starring Lon Chaney Jr. and Maila (Vampira) Nurmi; Ed Wood was there and acted as Lugosi's dialogue coach backstage
Metropolitan State Hospital Interview (August 1, 1955) interview filmed upon his medical release
The Tom Duggan Show (Summer, 1956) Lugosi was interviewed about his drug addiction and cure
The Black Sleep Theatrical Premiere (appeared live at the theatre on June 27, 1956)
Lugosi, The Forgotten King (a 1985 documentary)

Stage Play credits (in U.S. only)
(Note* - Lugosi appeared in at least 172 plays in his native Hungary between 1902 and 1918)

Little Miss Bluebeard (June, 1921) - Lugosi and his 2nd wife Ilona von Montagh met while co-starring in this NY City play, performed in Hungarian language
Torveny (The Law) - Lugosi and Ilona von Montagh co-starred in this Hungarian language play in Bridgeport, Connecticut in September 1921 (Lugosi directed the play as well)
Liliom - Lugosi and von Montagh co-starred in this Hungarian language play in NY City in September 1921; the two were married that month
Sarga Liliom - (late 1921) performed in New York in Hungarian language
Getto (February 1922) performed in New York in Hungarian language; also directed by Lugosi
A demarkacio szinmu (circa March 1922) - performed in New York in Hungarian language
The Tragedy of Man - opened April 8, 1922 (N.Y. City) Lugosi played Adam and also directed this play in Hungarian language; co-starred Ilona von Montagh
The Red Poppy - opened Dec 20, 1922 (Greenwich Village) in his first English language play, Lugosi starred as Fernando; co-starred Estelle Winwood and Arthur Lubin.
Die Sorina (November 1923) performed at Columbia University in N.Y. City in Hungarian language; Lugosi also directed this play
The Right to Dream (1924) Lugosi was contracted to direct this N.Y. play by producer Irving Davis, but Davis quickly fired him after deeming him not talented enough; Lugosi sued Davis in court on May 21, 1924, for breach of contract, but lost the case.
The Werewolf - opened June 1, 1924 (Chicago) Lugosi left this play after only one week (played Vincente, a butler)
Forradalmi nasz (February 1925) performed in N.Y. City in the Hungarian language
Arabesque - Oct 20, 1925 - Nov 07, 1925 (N.Y. City); played an Arab sheik
Open House - Dec 14, 1925 - Feb 10, 1926 (N.Y. City); played Sergius Chernoff, a Russian
The Devil in the Cheese - Dec 29, 1926 - May 1927 (N.Y. City) played both Father Petros and Cardos the bandit; co-starred Fredric March and Dwight Frye; 165 performances
Dracula - Oct 05, 1927 - May 19, 1928 (N.Y. City) as Dracula;  co-starred Edward Van Sloan and Bernard Jukes as Renfield
Dracula - June 24, 1928 - Sept. 15, 1928 (Los Angeles, San Francisco, Oakland) with Bernard Jukes as Renfield; Lugosi relocated to California in 1928.
Dracula - May 19, 1929 - Aug. 17, 1929 (Los Angeles, San Francisco, Oakland) with Harry Walker as Renfield; all told 265 performances
Murdered Alive - April 2, 1932 - May 5, 1932 (Los Angeles, San Francisco, Los Angeles) played Dr. Orloff, a mad sculptor
Dracula - May 29, 1932 - June 5, 1932 (Portland, Oregon) with Perry Ivins as Renfield (who also directed the play)
Murder at the Vanities - Sep 8, 1933 - Mar 10, 1934 (N.Y. City) played Siebenkase; co-starred Olga Baclanova and Robert Cummings; 298 performances
Tovarich - opened Mar. 22, 1937 - May 15, 1937 (San Francisco, Los Angeles) played Commissar Gorotchenko
Stardust Cavalcade Revue - March 30, 1940 to May 2, 1940 (Ohio, Pennsylvania, Connecticut, New York City and Washington DC) toured with Ed Sullivan and Arthur Treacher (Lugosi appeared again in several summer tours reprising scenes from Dracula between 1940 and 1946.)
One Night of Horror - May 2–8, 1941 (Chicago) a spook show Lugosi put on for the premiere of his film, The Invisible Ghost 
Dracula - opened April 30, 1943 - June 26, 1943 (East Coast tour/ Plymouth/ Boston)
Arsenic and Old Lace - Aug. 5, 1943 - Sept. 22, 1943 (San Francisco, Los Angeles) played Jonathan Brewster
Arsenic and Old Lace - Jan. 29, 1944 - June 3, 1944 (East Coast tour) played Jonathan Brewster
No Traveler Returns - Feb. 26, 1945 - March 19, 1945 (San Francisco, Seattle) played Bharat Singh, a Hindu servant; co-starred Ian Keith
That We May Live - Dec. 17–18, 1946 - a two-day show at the Los Angeles Shrine Auditorium
A Nightmare of Horror - Feb. 7–8, 1947 (San Diego) a two-night spook show held at San Diego's Orpheum Theater
Three Indelicate Ladies - April 10, 1947 - April 19, 1947 (New Haven, Boston) played Francis O'Rourke, co-starred Ray Walston
Arsenic and Old Lace - June 30, 1947 - July 5, 1947 (Pennsylvania) played Jonathan Brewster
Dracula - July 14, 1947 - Aug. 2, 1947 (Connecticut, Long Island, Massachusetts, Pennsylvania, Connecticut) co-starred Simon Oakland as Van Helsing and Ray Walston as Renfield in some towns
Arsenic and Old Lace - Aug. 5, 1947 - Aug. 10, 1947 (Sarasota Springs, N.Y.) with Richard Boone as a policeman
Bill Neff's Madhouse of Mystery - mid-1947 (California) - a spook show play in which Lugosi appeared at various movie theaters
The Tell-Tale Heart - Nov. 19, 1947 - Dec. 23, 1947 (Illinois, Wisconsin, Michigan) a 40-minute one-man spook show scripted by Lugosi's agent Don Marlowe (consisting of Lugosi doing a monologue with a beating heart heard throughout); apparently Marlowe made a 16-inch transcription disc recording of the show, which is today considered lost.
Promotional Appearances for Abbott and Costello Meet Frankenstein (June 1948) appeared in a live stage act with Glenn Strange dressed as the Monster (L.A., San Francisco and San Diego)
Dracula July 8, 1948 - Aug. 7, 1948 (Colorado, Pennsylvania, Connecticut)
Arsenic and Old Lace - August 9, 1948 - August 14, 1948 (Sea Cliff, NJ) Lugosi first met producers Richard and Alex Gordon at this show
The Bela Lugosi Company Vaudeville Show - Aug. 20, 1948 -Oct. 29, 1948 (Detroit, Miami and Atlantic City) a traveling vaudeville act put on at various movie theaters
Nightmare of Horror Stage Show (early 1949) appeared with Glenn Strange, as Dracula and the Frankenstein Monster (San Diego, Los Angeles)
Arsenic and Old Lace - July 11, 1949 - Aug. 21, 1949 (New York, New Jersey, Connecticut, Pennsylvania)
The Bela Lugosi Company Vaudeville Show - Nov. 16 - Nov. 23, 1949 (St. Louis, Wichita) - a traveling vaudeville act in which Lillian Lugosi played a small role onstage (the hypnotized maid in a "Dracula" skit)
Dracula - Mar. 20, 1950 - March 25, 1950 (St. Petersburg, Florida); July 4, 1950 - July 7, 1950 (Vermont)
The Devil Also Dreams - July 24, 1950 - August 26, 1950 (Massachusetts, New York, Canada) played the butler Alexander Petofy
Bela Lugosi's Horror and Magic Stage Show - Dec. 6, 1950 - March, 1951 (New York, New Jersey) - a traveling vaudeville act that ended when Lugosi had to leave for England in April
Dracula - Apr. 30, 1951 - mid-September, 1951 (England) Lugosi and Lillian toured England in this low-budget production in 1951
Arsenic and Old Lace - Jan. 19, 1954 - Jan. 25, 1954 (St. Louis)
The Bela Lugosi Revue (Feb. 19, 1954 - Mar. 27, 1954) a one-hour stage act (performed at least 3 times per day) at the Silver Slipper Saloon, Las Vegas; directed and co-written by Ed Wood
The Devil's Paradise - June 8, 1956 - June 9, 1956 (Los Angeles) Lugosi plays an unnamed narcotics smuggler

References

Sources

External links
 

Male actor filmographies
American filmographies